Helmuth Rudolph (1900–1971) was a German actor.

Selected filmography
 So Ended a Great Love (1934)
 The Last Waltz (1934)
 Blum Affair (1948)
 Blocked Signals (1948)
 Love '47 (1949)
 The Prisoner (1949)
 Don't Dream, Annette (1949)
 Amico (1949)
 Good Fortune in Ohio (1950)
 The Man Who Wanted to Live Twice (1950)
 The Dubarry (1951)
 The Csardas Princess (1951)
 The Lost One (1951)
 I Can't Marry Them All (1952)
 Fight of the Tertia (1952)
 It Was Always So Nice With You (1954)
 The Telephone Operator (1954)
 Alibi (1955)
 The Story of Anastasia (1956)
 Devil in Silk (1956)
 My Father, the Actor (1956)
 Charley's Aunt (1956)
 Wir Wunderkinder (1958)
 Murderers Club of Brooklyn (1967)

External links

1900 births
1971 deaths
German male film actors
20th-century German male actors